Berlin-Friedrichshain-Kreuzberg – Prenzlauer Berg East (German: Bundestagswahlkreis Berlin-Friedrichshain-Kreuzberg – Prenzlauer Berg Ost) is an electoral constituency (German: Wahlkreis) represented in the Bundestag. It elects one member via first-past-the-post voting. Under the current constituency numbering system, it is designated as constituency 83. It is located in central Berlin, comprising the Friedrichshain-Kreuzberg borough.

Berlin-Friedrichshain-Kreuzberg – Prenzlauer Berg East was created for the 2002 federal election. Since 2017, it has been represented by Canan Bayram of the Alliance 90/The Greens.

Geography
Berlin-Friedrichshain-Kreuzberg – Prenzlauer Berg East is located in central Berlin. As of the 2021 federal election, it comprises the Friedrichshain-Kreuzberg borough as well as the area of Prenzlauer Berg east of Prenzlauer Allee. It is the smallest federal constituency in Germany by area.

History
Berlin-Friedrichshain-Kreuzberg – Prenzlauer Berg East was created in 2002. In the 2002 through 2009 elections, it was constituency 84 in the numbering system. Since the 2013 election, it has been number 83. Its borders have not changed since its creation.

Members
Until 2021, the constituency had the unique distinction of being the only federal constituency ever held by The Greens. It was first represented by Hans-Christian Ströbele, who was elected in 2002. He was re-elected in the 2005, 2009, and 2013 elections. Upon his retirement in the 2017 election, he was succeeded by Canan Bayram, who narrowly retained the constituency for the Greens. She was re-elected in 2021 with a greatly increased margin.

Election results

2021 election

2017 election

2013 election

2009 election

References

Federal electoral districts in Berlin
Friedrichshain-Kreuzberg
Pankow
2002 establishments in Germany
Constituencies established in 2002